Melbourne Rugby Football Club is an English rugby union club that plays in Midlands 1 East following the club's promotion from Midlands 2 East (North) as champions at the end of the 2018-19 season.

History
The club has grown rapidly since its establishment in 1982 - an account of which now exists on the club website. In 2016 the development a central pavilion (the Melbourne Sporting Partnership) was completed, delivering modern function rooms and changing rooms for the club and its sister clubs (football, cricket and tennis). Ongoing investments continue - an electronic score board adorns the pavilion, and further developments of the pitches are expected to be confirmed in early 2020.

Recent
The club has over 400 regular players in the 2019/20 season. The seniors' section includes the 1st XV, and also a 2XV, a 3XV, and an Academy for transitioning U16s into seniors rugby. The large minis and junior section for boys and girls rugby accounts for 2/3 of the club player base. Touch rugby is also played year-round.
Melbourne RFC recently featured in the June 2019 edition of Rugby Club Magazine.

A former England U18s', Will Allman's home club is Melbourne.

Club Honours
Notts, Lincs & Derbyshire 4 West champions: 1988–89
Midlands 3 East (North) champions: 2012–13
Midlands 2 East (North) champions (2): 2016–17, 2018–19

References

External links
 Club Website
 Club Facebook Page
 Club Flickr Archive

English rugby union teams
Rugby union in Derbyshire
Rugby clubs established in 1982
1982 establishments in England